The "Wiking-Jugend" (WJ, "Viking youth") was a German Neo-Nazi organization modeled on the Hitlerjugend.

The Sozialistische Reichspartei (SRP) was outlawed in 1952, together with its youth organization "". The group was active in the pan-European nationalist New European Order, although they quit in 1955 over the issue of South Tyrol.

The organization was founded by Walter Matthaei, and thereafter took on a dynastic tendency, being headed in turn by Raoul Nahrath, then his son Wolfgang, and then his son Wolfram.

Until 1991, Stolberg (Rhineland) was the headquarters of the WJ. From 1991 to 1994, it was in Berlin.

The Wiking-Jugend was outlawed as unconstitutional on 10 November 1994 by the North Rhine-Westphalian Ministry of the Interior.

See also
Wotanism

References

German nationalist organizations
Neo-Nazi organizations
Neo-Nazism in Germany
Organizations with year of establishment missing
Organizations disestablished in 1994
1994 disestablishments in Germany